You're Wrong About is an American history and pop culture podcast created by journalist Michael Hobbes and writer Sarah Marshall. It has been hosted by Marshall since its inception; Hobbes also hosted until 2021. Launched in May 2018, the show explores misunderstood media events by interrogating why and how the public got things wrong. Show topics have included events like the Challenger Disaster, O. J. Simpson Trial, and the Murder of Kitty Genovese and covered people such as Anna Nicole Smith, Yoko Ono, Tonya Harding, and Lorena Bobbitt. It was named one of the ten best podcasts by Time in 2019.

About

Michael Hobbes is an American journalist and a former reporter for HuffPost. He is also the co-host of the podcast Maintenance Phase with Aubrey Gordon. Sarah Marshall is an American writer whose work has appeared in BuzzFeed, The Believer, and The New Republic. She is known for an interest in the mischaracterization of women by the mainstream media best demonstrated in her 2014 long-form profile of Tonya Harding. The show began after Hobbes reached out to Marshall and proposed that they try to recreate their deep-dive research processes in audio format. The pair only met in person after recording the show remotely for the first five months.

During each episode, Hobbes and Marshall trade off on researching the show's topic, with one host taking on the research and analysis of a topic and the other coming to the discussion with little-to-no knowledge about the relevant details. Each episode begins with the less informed host sharing what they remember about the person or event in question. Together they then explore the topic in a generally chronological manner, discussing relevant public responses and dominant societal trends from the era, before debunking that response and the subsequent media coverage. Witty observations and pop-culture references are woven in throughout the discussion. The discussions include references to primary resources used during the research process along with and direct quotes from media coverage interviews with relevant players.

In March 2020, the podcast began a quarantine book club in response to COVID-19 lockdowns. The related episodes differ from the regular format as they focus on a single book with one host having read it and the other learning about it over the course of multiple episodes. Books covered include the satanic ritual abuse book Michelle Remembers, Jessica Simpson's autobiography Open Book, and Objection! by American lawyer and television personality Nancy Grace.

The podcast is a part-time effort for both hosts and relies on crowd-funding. The independent nature of the show is rooted in moral concerns about critiquing the media and potential constraints inherent to sponsorship.

In October 2021, it was announced that Hobbes was leaving the podcast and the show would continue with Marshall and guests.

Reception
In 2019, You're Wrong About was named one of the ten best podcasts by Time. Writing for the Irish Times, Sarah Griffin praised the show's conversational tone noting how Hobbes and Marshall "handle incredibly dark subjects with a levity that never feels disrespectful." Rachel Syme compared Hobbes and Marshall as a modern-day Statler and Waldorf, claiming their show is a history podcast that "assumes the audience is capable of complex thought."

Episode list

2018

2019

2020

2021

2022

References

External links
 

2018 podcast debuts
American podcasts
Audio podcasts
Feminist podcasts
History podcasts
Patreon creators